Platylobium triangulare , commonly known as ivy flat-pea, is a  shrub species that is endemic to Australia. It is a member of the family Fabaceae and of the genus Platylobium. The species was formally described in 1812 by botanist Robert Brown in Hortus Kewensis. The type specimen was collected in Tasmania by Brown.

The species has often been misidentified as ''Platylobium obtusangulum.

References

triangulare
Fabales of Australia
Flora of Tasmania
Flora of Victoria (Australia)
Plants described in 1812